Endre Hansen (born 14 February 1978) is a Norwegian football midfielder who currently plays for Øystese IL.

He started his career in IL Kvernbit. He was in the squad of SK Brann in 2001, but did not get any Norwegian Premier League games until the next year. He played 12 games in 2002. After the season, he was declared unwanted by Brann. He then joined Åsane. After the 2004 season he joined Løv-Ham. After the 2007 season he rejoined Åsane, but ahead of the 2011 season he went back to Løv-Ham. In 2012, he joined fourth-tier club Øystese IL.

References

1978 births
Living people
People from Meland
Norwegian footballers
SK Brann players
Åsane Fotball players
Løv-Ham Fotball players
Eliteserien players
Association football midfielders
Sportspeople from Vestland